Census-designated places (CDPs) are unincorporated communities lacking elected municipal officers and boundaries with legal status. South Dakota has 79 census designated places.

Census-designated places

References

Census-designated places in South Dakota
South Dakota